Ixchela is a genus of cellar spiders that was first described by B. A. Huber in 2000.

Species
 it contains twenty-two species, found in El Salvador, Honduras, Guatemala, and Mexico:
Ixchela abernathyi (Gertsch, 1971) – Mexico
Ixchela azteca Valdez-Mondragón & Francke, 2015 – Mexico. Named after the Aztec people.
Ixchela franckei Valdez-Mondragón, 2013 – Mexico
Ixchela furcula (F. O. Pickard-Cambridge, 1902) (type) – Guatemala, Honduras, El Salvador
Ixchela grix Valdez-Mondragón, 2013 – Mexico
Ixchela huasteca Valdez-Mondragón, 2013 – Mexico. Named after La Huasteca, where this species is found.
Ixchela huberi Valdez-Mondragón, 2013 – Mexico
Ixchela jalisco Valdez-Mondragón & Francke, 2015 – Mexico. Named after the state of Jalisco, where this species is found.
Ixchela juarezi Valdez-Mondragón, 2013 – Mexico. Named after Benito Juárez.
Ixchela mendozai Valdez-Mondragón & Francke, 2015 – Mexico
Ixchela mixe Valdez-Mondragón, 2013 – Mexico. Named after the Mixe people.
Ixchela panchovillai Valdez-Mondragón, 2020 – Mexico. Named after Pancho Villa.
Ixchela pecki (Gertsch, 1971) – Mexico
Ixchela placida (Gertsch, 1971) – Mexico
Ixchela purepecha Valdez-Mondragón & Francke, 2015 – Mexico. Named after the Purépecha people.
Ixchela santibanezi Valdez-Mondragón, 2013 – Mexico
Ixchela simoni (O. Pickard-Cambridge, 1898) – Mexico
Ixchela taxco Valdez-Mondragón, 2013 – Mexico
Ixchela tlayuda Valdez-Mondragón & Francke, 2015 – Mexico. Named after the tlayuda dish, typical of Oaxaca, where this species is found.
Ixchela tzotzil Valdez-Mondragón, 2013 – Mexico. Named after the Tzotzil people.
Ixchela viquezi Valdez-Mondragón, 2013 – Honduras
Ixchela zapatai Valdez-Mondragón, 2020 – Mexico. Named after Emiliano Zapata.

See also
 List of Pholcidae species

References

Araneomorphae genera
Pholcidae
Spiders of Central America
Spiders of Mexico